Douglas International Airport can refer to:
Bisbee Douglas International Airport near Bisbee, Arizona
Charlotte Douglas International Airport in Charlotte, North Carolina